A parvis or parvise is the open space in front of and around a cathedral or church, especially when surrounded by either colonnades or porticoes, as at St. Peter's Basilica in Rome. It is thus a church-specific type of forecourt, front yard or apron.

Etymology
The term derives via Old French from the Latin paradisus meaning "paradise". This in turn came via Ancient Greek from the Indo-European Aryan languages of  ancient Iran, where it meant a walled enclosure or garden precinct with heavenly flowers planted by the Clercs (Clerics).

Parvis of St Paul's Cathedral
In London in the Middle Ages the  Serjeants-at-law practised at the parvis of St Paul's Cathedral, where clients could seek their counsel. In the 14th century Geoffrey Chaucer referred to "A sergeant of the laws ware and wise/ That often hadde yben at the paruis...". Later, ecclesiastical courts developed at Doctors' Commons on the same site.

Late English use

In England the term was much later used to mean a room over the porch of a church. The architectural historians John Fleming, Hugh Honour and Nikolaus Pevsner, and the theologians  Frank Cross and Elizabeth Livingstone all say this usage is wrong. The Oxford English Dictionary records this use as being "historical", and current in the middle of the 19th century. It may stem from an earlier misuse in F. Blomefield's book Norfolk, published in 1744.

Examples of English parvises

See also
Church of the Holy Sepulchre

References

Sources and further reading

Architectural elements